RWE may refer to:

RWE AG, German multinational energy company
 RWE Incorporated, An airport services company based in Wilmington, Delaware, USA
Ralph Waldo Emerson (1803-1882), American lecturer, philosopher, essayist, and poet
Rot-Weiss Essen, German association football club
Read write execute (RWE), basic permissions of a computer file
Real world evidence (RWE), observational data obtained outside the context of randomized controlled trials (RCTs)
Right Wing Extremism, a radical, conservative hate and terrorist movement
Radio Wolna Europa, Polish for Radio Free Europe